Hon John Ian Murray, Lord Dervaird QC (July 8, 1935 – December 23, 2015) was a Scottish judge. His judicial career ended in 1989 after a scandal in which it was rumoured he had an affair with another man.

References

1935 births
2015 deaths
Scottish judges